Pablo de Madalengoitia (1919–1999) was a Peruvian journalist.

Programs 
 La pregunta de los 500 mil reales (1960–1962)
 Pablo y sus amigos (1961–1962)
 Scala regala (1960)
 Esta es su vida (1965)
 Cancionísima (1967–1968)
 Este es su día (1966–1967)
 El clan del 4 (1968)
 Helen Curtis pregunta por 64 mil soles (1969)
 Lo que vale el saber (1977)
 Usted es el juez (1968–1969)
 Especiales musicales (1979)
 24 horas (1980)
 La pregunta de los 10 millones (1982)
 La pregunta de los 25 millones (1984)
 Bienvenida la música (1987)
 Agenda personal (1988)
 Los especiales de Panamericana (1991–1996) 
 Magazine (1981, 1991)

People from Lima
Peruvian journalists
Male journalists
Peruvian male writers
1919 births
1999 deaths
20th-century journalists